The 1945–46 Kansas Jayhawks men's basketball team represented the University of Kansas during the 1945–46 college men's basketball season.

Roster
Wendell Clark
Don Auten
Eugene Barr
Otto Schnellbacher
Donald Frisby
Jack Ballard
Owen Peck
Hoyt Baker
Ray Evans
Charles B. Black
Gilbert Stramel
Dean Corder
George Gear
Gustave Daum
Maurice Martin
Gene Petersen
Gene Anderson

Schedule

References

Kansas Jayhawks men's basketball seasons
Kansas
Kansas
Kansas